Scrub(s) may refer to:
 Scrub, low shrub and grass characteristic of scrubland
 Scrubs (clothing), worn by medical staff
 Scrubs (TV series), an American television program
 Scrubs (occupation), also called "scrub tech," "scrub nurse," or "surgical technologist"
 Wormwood Scrubs, also known as "The Scrubs", an area in west London
 HM Prison Wormwood Scrubs, also known as "The Scrubs", a prison in London
 Scrub baseball, also known as "scrub" or "scrubs", an informal game of baseball without teams
 Patrick Drake and Robin Scorpio, a supercouple featured on the daytime soap opera General Hospital, known to fans as "Scrubs"

See also 
 Carbon dioxide scrubber, which absorbs that gas from exhaled air in a rebreather, a spacecraft or submersible craft
 Scrubbing (audio), an interaction in which a playhead is dragged across a segment of audio to play it
 Data scrubbing, an error correction technique
 Deku Scrubs or Deku, a fictional race of creatures in The Legend of Zelda media
 "No Scrubs", a song by TLC from Fanmail
 Scrubber (disambiguation)